This is a list of the Russian moth species of the superfamilies Choreutoidea, Urodoidea, Schreckensteinioidea, Epermenioidea, Alucitoidea, Pterophoroidea, Copromorphoidea and Thyridoidea. It also acts as an index to the species articles and forms part of the full List of moths of Russia.

Choreutoidea

Choreutidae
Anthophila abhasica Danilevsky, 1969
Anthophila armata Danilevsky, 1969
Anthophila bidzilyai Budashkin, 1997
Anthophila colchica Danilevsky, 1969
Anthophila decolorana Danilevsky, 1969
Anthophila fabriciana (Linnaeus, 1767)
Anthophila filipjevi Danilevsky, 1969
Choreutis atrosignata (Christoph, 1888)
Choreutis diana (Hübner, 1822)
Choreutis nemorana (Hübner, 1799)
Choreutis pariana (Clerck, 1759)
Choreutis vinosa (Diakonoff, 1978)
Millieria dolosalis (Heydenreich, 1851)
Prochoreutis alpina (Arita, 1976)
Prochoreutis anikini Budashkin, 2006
Prochoreutis hadrogastra (Diakonoff, 1978)
Prochoreutis holotoxa (Meyrick, 1903)
Prochoreutis monognoma (Diakonoff, 1978)
Prochoreutis myllerana (Fabricius, 1794)
Prochoreutis sachalinensis (Danilevsky, 1969)
Prochoreutis sehestediana (Fabricius, 1776)
Prochoreutis solaris (Erschoff, 1877)
Prochoreutis stellaris (Zeller, 1847)
Prochoreutis subdelicata Arita, 1987
Prochoreutis ultimana (Krulikowsky, 1909)
Prochoreutis ussurica (Danilevsky, 1969)
Tebenna bjerkandrella (Thunberg, 1784)
Tebenna chingana Danilevsky, 1969
Tebenna submicalis Danilevsky, 1969

Urodoidea

Urodidae
Wockia asperipunctella (Bruand, 1851)

Schreckensteinioidea

Schreckensteiniidae
Schreckensteinia festaliella (Hübner, [1819])

Epermenioidea

Epermeniidae
Epermenia aequidentella (Hofmann, 1867)
Epermenia chaerophyllella (Goeze, 1783)
Epermenia devotella (Heyden, 1863)
Epermenia falciformis (Haworth, 1828)
Epermenia farreni (Walsingham, 1894)
Epermenia illigerella (Hübner, [1813])
Epermenia iniquella (Wocke, 1867)
Epermenia insecurella (Stainton, 1849)
Epermenia ochreomaculella ochreomaculella (Milliere, 1854)
Epermenia ochreomaculella asiatica Gaedike, 1979
Epermenia petrusella (Heylaerts, 1883)
Epermenia pontificella (Hübner, 1796)
Epermenia profugella (Stainton, 1856)
Epermenia scurella (Stainton, 1851)
Epermenia sergei Budashkin, 1996
Epermenia sinjovi Gaedike, 1993
Epermenia strictella (Wocke, 1867)
Epermenia thailandica Gaedike, 1987
Ochromolopis kaszabi Gaedike, 1973
Ochromolopis zagulajevi Budashkin & Satschkov, 1991
Phaulernis chasanica Gaedike, 1993
Phaulernis dentella (Zeller, 1839)
Phaulernis fulviguttella (Zeller, 1839)
Phaulernis pulchra Gaedike, 1993

Alucitoidea

Alucitidae
Alucita cancellata (Meyrick, 1908)
Alucita desmodactyla Zeller, 1847
Alucita eumorphodactyla (Caradja, 1920)
Alucita grammodactyla Zeller, 1841
Alucita helena Ustjuzhanin, 1991
Alucita hexadactyla Linnaeus, 1758
Alucita huebneri Wallengren, 1859
Alucita klimeschi Scholz, 1997
Alucita palodactyla Zeller, 1847
Alucita poecilodactyla Alphéraky, 1876
Alucita sakhalinica Zagulajev, 1995
Alucita ussurica Ustjuzhanin, 1999
Alucita zonodactyla Zeller, 1847
Pterotopteryx dodecadactyla (Hübner, [1813])
Pterotopteryx lonicericola Kuznetzov, 1978
Pterotopteryx monticola Zagulajev, 1992
Pterotopteryx synaphodactyla (Alphéraky, 1876)

Pterophoroidea

Pterophoridae
Adaina microdactyla (Hübner, [1813])
Agdistis adactyla (Hübner, [1823])
Agdistis caradjai Arenberger, 1975
Agdistis dahurica Zagulajev, 1994
Agdistis falkovitshi Zagulajev, 1986
Agdistis frankeniae (Zeller, 1847)
Agdistis ingens Christoph, 1887
Agdistis intermedia Caradja, 1920
Agdistis kulunda Ustjuzhanin, 1991
Agdistis manicata Staudinger, 1859
Agdistis mevlaniella Arenberger, 1972
Agdistis paralia (Zeller, 1847)
Agdistis rubasiensis Zagulajev, 1985
Agdistis tamaricis (Zeller, 1847)
Amblyptilia acanthadactyla (Hübner, [1813])
Amblyptilia grisea Gibeaux, 1997
Amblyptilia punctidactyla (Haworth, 1811)
Buckleria paludum (Zeller, 1839)
Buszkoiana capnodactylus (Zeller, 1841)
Calyciphora albodactyla (Fabricius, 1794)
Calyciphora homoiodactyla (Kasy, 1960)
Calyciphora nephelodactyla (Eversmann, 1844)
Calyciphora xanthodactyla (Treitschke, 1833)
Capperia celeusi (Frey, 1886)
Capperia fusca (Hofmann, 1898)
Capperia maratonica Adamczewski, 1951
Capperia trichodactyla ([Denis & Schiffermüller], 1775)
Cnaemidophorus rhododactyla ([Denis & Schiffermüller], 1775)
Crombrugghia distans (Zeller, 1847)
Crombrugghia kollari (Stainton, 1851)
Crombrugghia laetus (Zeller, 1847)
Crombrugghia tristis (Zeller, 1841)
Emmelina argoteles (Meyrick, 1922)
Emmelina monodactyla (Linnaeus, 1758)
Emmelina pseudojezonica Derra, 1987
Fuscoptilia emarginata (Snellen, 1884)
Geina didactyla (Linnaeus, 1758)
Gillmeria macrornis (Meyrick, 1930)
Gillmeria melanoschista (T. B. Fletcher, 1940)
Gillmeria miantodactylus (Zeller, 1841)
Gillmeria pallidactyla (Haworth, 1811)
Gillmeria rhusiodactyla (Fuchs, 1903)
Gillmeria stenoptiloides (Filipjev, 1927)
Gillmeria tetradactyla (Linnaeus, 1758)
Gillmeria vesta Ustjuzhanin, 1996
Gypsochares baptodactylus (Zeller, 1850)
Gypsochares kyraensis (Ustjuzhanin, 1996)
Hellinsia albidactyla (Yano, 1963)
Hellinsia carphodactyla (Hilbner, [1813])
Hellinsia chrysocomae (Ragonot, 1875)
Hellinsia didactylites (Strom, 1783)
Hellinsia distinctus (Herrich-Schäffer, 1855)
Hellinsia innocens (Snellen, 1884)
Hellinsia inulae (Zeller, 1852)
Hellinsia ishiyamana (Matsumura, 1931)
Hellinsia kuwayamai (Matsumura, 1931)
Hellinsia lienigianus (Zeller, 1852)
Hellinsia mongolica (Zagulajev & Pentscukovskaja, 1972)
Hellinsia nigridactyla (Yano, 1961)
Hellinsia osteodactylus (Zeller, 1841)
Hellinsia pectodactylus (Staudinger, 1859)
Hellinsia tephradactyla (Hübner, [1813])
Hellinsia trimmatodactylus (Christoph, 1872)
Hellinsia wrangeliensis (Zagulajev, 1985)
Marasmarcha cinnamomea (Staudinger, 1870)
Marasmarcha colossa Caradja, 1920
Marasmarcha lydia Ustjuzhanin, 1996
Marasmarcha rhypodactyla (Staudinger, 1871)
Merrifieldia baliodactylus (Zeller, 1841)
Merrifieldia leucodactyla ([Denis & Schiffermüller], 1775)
Merrifieldia malacodactylus (Zeller, 1847)
Merrifieldia tridactyla (Linnaeus, 1758)
Oidaematophorus iwatensis (Matsumura, 1931)
Oidaematophorus lithodactyla (Treitschke, 1833)
Oidaematophorus rogenhoferi (Mann, 1871)
Oirata poculidactyla (Nupponen & Nupponen, 2001)
Oirata volgensis (Moschler, 1862)
Oxyptilus chrysodactyla ([Denis & Schiffermüller], 1775)
Oxyptilus ericetorum (Stainton, 1851)
Oxyptilus parvidactyla (Haworth, 1811)
Oxyptilus pilosellae (Zeller, 1841)
Paraplatyptilia hedemanni (Snellen, 1884)
Paraplatyptilia metzneri (Zeller, 1841)
Paraplatyptilia sahlbergi (Poppius, 1906)
Paraplatyptilia sibirica (Zagulajev, 1983)
Paraplatyptilia terminalis (Erschoff, 1877)
Paraplatyptilia vacillans (Snellen, 1884)
Platyptilia ainonis Matsumura, 1931
Platyptilia ardua McDunnough, 1927
Platyptilia calodactyla ([Denis & Schiffermüller], 1775)
Platyptilia farfarellus Zeller, 1867
Platyptilia gonodactyla ([Denis & Schiffermüller], 1775)
Platyptilia lusi Ustjuzhanin, 1996
Platyptilia naminga Ustjuzhanin, 1996
Platyptilia nemoralis Zeller, 1841
Platyptilia tesseradactyla (Linnaeus, 1761)
Platyptilia tshukotka Ustjuzhanin, 1996
Platyptilia ussuriensis (Caradja, 1920)
Porrittia galactodactyla ([Denis & Schiffermüller], 1775)
Procapperia kuldschaensis (Rebel, 1914)
Procapperia linariae (Chretien, 1922)
Procapperia maculatus (Constant, 1865)
Pselnophorus heterodactyla (Muller, 1764)
Pselnophorus poggei (Mann, 1862)
Pselnophorus vilis (Butler, 1881)
Pterophorus ischnodactyla (Treitschke, 1835)
Pterophorus pentadactyla (Linnaeus, 1758)
Septuaginta zagulajevi Ustjuzhanin, 1996
Stenoptilia admiranda Yano, 1963
Stenoptilia annadactyla Sutter, 1988
Stenoptilia bipunctidactyla (Scopo1i, 1763)
Stenoptilia convexa Arenberger, 1998
Stenoptilia coprodactyla (Stainton, 1851)
Stenoptilia eborinodactyla Zagulajev, 1986
Stenoptilia graphodactyla (Treitschke, 1833)
Stenoptilia islandicus (Staudinger, 1857)
Stenoptilia jacutica Ustjuzhanin, 1996
Stenoptilia kosterini Ustjuzhanin, 2001
Stenoptilia kurushensis Kovtunovich, 2000
Stenoptilia latistriga Rebel, 1916
Stenoptilia luteocinerea (Snellen, 1884)
Stenoptilia mannii (Zeller, 1852)
Stenoptilia nolckeni (Tengstrom, 1869)
Stenoptilia parnasia Arenberger, 1986
Stenoptilia pelidnodactyla (Stein, 1837)
Stenoptilia pinarodactyla (Erschoff, 1877)
Stenoptilia pneumonanthes (Buttner, 1880)
Stenoptilia poculi Arenberger, 1998
Stenoptilia pterodactyla (Linnaeus, 1761)
Stenoptilia stigmatodactylus (Zeller, 1852)
Stenoptilia stigmatoides Sutter & Skyva, 1992
Stenoptilia veronicae Karvonen, 1932
Stenoptilia zophodactylus (Duponchel, 1840)
Stenoptilodes taprobanes (R.Felder & Rogenhofer, 1875)
Tabulaephorus decipiens (Lederer, 1870)
Tabulaephorus marptys (Christoph, 1872)
Tabulaephorus ussuriensis (Caradja, 1920)
Wheeleria obsoletus (Zeller, 1841)
Wheeleria phlomidis (Staudinger, 1871)
Wheeleria spilodactylus (Curtis, 1827)

Copromorphoidea

Carposinidae
Carposina askoldana Diakonoff, 1989
Carposina maritima Ponomarenko, 1999
Carposina sasakii Matsumura, 1900
Carposina viduana Caradja, 1916
Meridarchis excisa (Walsingham, 1900)

Thyridoidea

Thyrididae
Pyrinioides aureus Butler, 1881
Rhodoneura erecta (Leech, 1889)
Rhodoneura shini Park & Byun, 1990
Rhodoneura vittula Guenee, 1858
Sericophara guttata Christoph, 1881
Striglina cancellata (Christoph, 1881)
Thyris fenestrella (Scopoli, 1763)
Thyris usitata Butler, 1879

References 

Moths